Vasile Tarlev (born 6 October 1963) is a Moldovan politician.

Background and earlier life
He studied engineering and became a member of assorted economic councils. After 2001 Moldovan parliamentary election, He was appointed Prime Minister on April 19, 2001. This is the first time since 1990 that the Communists won a parliamentary election.

Tarlev is ethnically a Bessarabian Bulgarian and was born in Bașcalia, Basarabeasca district.

Prime Minister of Moldova
Tarlev served as Prime Minister of Moldova from 2001 until 2008, until 2017 he was the only prime minister to win two consecutive terms.

He resigned on March 19, 2008 in an unexpected move, saying that he wanted to make way for "new people." Parliament approved his resignation on March 20, and President Vladimir Voronin proposed Zinaida Greceanîi as his successor; she was approved by Moldovan Parliament on 31 March 2008.

See also

 Politics of Moldova
 First Tarlev Cabinet
 Second Tarlev Cabinet

References
 

Moldovan communists
1963 births
People from Basarabeasca District
Prime Ministers of Moldova
Bessarabian Bulgarians
Living people
Recipients of the Order of the Republic (Moldova)
Moldovan people of Bulgarian descent